David J. Smith (10 April 1880 – 15 August 1945) was a South African sport shooter who competed in the 1920 Summer Olympics and in the 1924 Summer Olympics.

1920 Antwerp

In 1920 he won the silver medal with the South African team in the team 600 metre military rifle, prone competition. In the 1920 Summer Olympics he also participated in the following events:

 Team 300 and 600 metre military rifle, prone - fifth place
 Team 300 metre military rifle, prone - eighth place
 Team 300 metre military rifle, standing - ninth place
 Team free rifle - tenth place
 300 metre free rifle, three positions - result unknown

1924 Paris

In the 1924 Summer Olympics he participated in the following events:

 Team free rifle - ninth place
 600 metre free rifle - 59th place

References

External links
profile

1945 deaths
1880 births
Scottish emigrants to South Africa
South African male sport shooters
ISSF rifle shooters
Olympic shooters of South Africa
Shooters at the 1920 Summer Olympics
Shooters at the 1924 Summer Olympics
Olympic silver medalists for South Africa
Olympic medalists in shooting
Medalists at the 1920 Summer Olympics